Radio y Televisión de Guerrero is a statewide public television network and series of radio stations, owned and operated by the agency of the same name in the State of Guerrero.

History
RTG began operations in 1980 with a television station, "Televisión Educativa", channel 7 in the state capital of Chilpancingo. On April 1, 1983, Radio Guerrero, then a separate department of the state government was founded. Its first station was XEGRO-AM 870 in Chilpancingo, and the first program on the station was the second government report of Alejandro Cervantes Delgado. In 1986, XEGRC-AM 820 was built in Coyuca de Catalán.

On June 26, 1987, the television and radio services were combined as Radio y Televisión de Guerrero. The following year, the radio and TV services expanded. Channel 7 added a more powerful transmitter in Acapulco, while AM stations were added in Ometepec and Taxco. At the end of the year, XHGRC-FM 97.7 Acapulco, the flagship of the entire service, came to air. While permitted by 2000, XHZTA-FM 92.1 in Zihuatanejo did not come on air until October 2016.

XEGRO-AM in Chilpancingo was off the air beginning in June 2012, when its equipment was stolen. In 2015, the state government began working to restore the station to service with equipment shared by XECHH-XHCHH "Capital Máxima".

Radio
RTG holds permits for these radio stations:

XHGRC-FM 97.7 Acapulco
XEGRO-AM 870 Chilpancingo
XEGRC-AM 820 Coyuca de Catalán
XEGRM-AM 1100 Ometepec
XEGRT-AM 1310 Taxco de Alarcón
XHZTA-FM 92.1 Zihuatanejo (repeats XHGRC-FM)

All of the AM stations are authorized as daytimers but operate from 5am to midnight. The FM stations operate 24 hours a day.

Television
RTG broadcasts a television service on two stations and on Satmex 5 C-band satellite nationally (4105 MHz, H, 2666kbit/s, FEC 3/4).

|-

|}

In the 2000s, the IPN's Once TV supplied programming to RTG under agreement. In 2006, Canal Once supplied 15 hours a day (on weekdays) of programming to RTG.

RTG's broadcasts in Chilpancingo have been sporadic. In 2012, it was reported that this transmitter was being shut down to conserve electricity. It received its digital authorization very late in 2016, for RF channel 35.

RTG began digital transmissions in 2016 in Acapulco on physical channel 33 and moved to virtual channel 4 in October 2016.

References

Television stations in Guerrero
Public radio in Mexico
Public television in Mexico